The majority leader is the chief spokesperson for the majority party (in politics) in the Hawaii House of Representatives.

Pre-statehood

House of Representatives of the State of Hawaiʻi

References

 
H